Paul Michael Wassarman (born March 26, 1940) is an American biologist who has been Professor in the Dept. of Cell, Developmental, and Regenerative Biology at the Icahn School of Medicine at Mount Sinai since 1996 (Chairman 2000-2007). His laboratory identified and characterised proteins that make up the zona pellucida (ZP) of mammalian eggs and determined their role in fertilisation.

Education
He earned his B.S. and M.S. from the University of Massachusetts, a PhD in biochemistry from Brandeis University (1963–1967; Advisor N.O.Kaplan) and was a postdoctoral fellow at the Laboratory of Molecular Biology, Cambridge, England (1967–1970; Sponsor, J.C.Kendrew).

Career

He was a faculty member in the Dept. of Biological Chemistry at Harvard Medical School (1972–1986) and the Dept. Cell and Developmental Biology, Roche Institute of Molecular Biology (1986–1996; Chairman 1987-1992).

Academic work 

His main research contributions lie in the areas of mammalian oogenesis and fertilization, particularly on the structure and function of the egg's ZP. His laboratory identified and characterised proteins that make up the ZP., identified growing oocytes as the site of synthesis of ZP proteins, demonstrated that two ZP proteins serve as sperm receptors during fertilization and are inactive following fertilization, identified regions of ZP polypeptides involved in ZP protein secretion and assembly, and proposed a structure for fibrils that constitute the ZP

He edited six volumes of Methods in Enzymology and four volumes of Current Topics in Developmental Biology, was series editor of Advances in Developmental Biology/Biochemistry, has been series editor of Current Topics in Developmental Biology since 2007, and authored "A Guide to Zona Pellucida Protein Domains" (Wiley, 2015) and "A Place in History: the Biography of John Kendrew" (Oxford University Press, 2020).

Awards and Honors
He was an NIH predoctoral fellow, Helen Hay Whitney Foundation postdoctoral fellow, Rockefeller Foundation special research fellow, and Lillian and Henry M. Stratton Professorial Chair.

References 

Living people
American biologists
Icahn School of Medicine at Mount Sinai faculty
Harvard Medical School faculty
University of Massachusetts alumni
Brandeis University alumni
1940 births